Akania is a village in the Chittagong Division of eastern Bangladesh. It is part of the union council Dakshin Kachua of Kachua Upazila, in the district of Chandpur. Administratively, it constitutes a mauza, which includes the villages of Akania (population of 2,628) and Rasulpur (145).

An accident in August 2007 resulted in the death of two children in the village.

References

Populated places in Chandpur District